Thommy Price (born December 9, 1956) is an American musician. He has played drums in a number of bands, including Scandal, Billy Idol, Blue Öyster Cult, and Joan Jett and the Blackhearts, and is an in-demand session drummer.

History
Price was already on the road drumming by the age of 16.  One of his first prolific gigs was playing drums for the band Scandal.  He performed on the band's classic Warrior album before moving on to Billy Idol. In 1986, he started drumming for Joan Jett and the Blackhearts, and he's been a member of the band for the past 28 years, even though he was originally just a studio musician.

On the side, Price formed the band Price/Sulton with his childhood friend and music partner Kasim Sulton. They co-wrote the music and Price played guitar and did vocals. They released a full-length album on CBS Records called Lights On. The song "No T.V. No Phone" was featured in the 1987 film The Allnighter, starring Susanna Hoffs.

Price is currently drumming in his own band in New York City. They recently finished recording an EP, Sex, Drums & Rock ’n’ Roll, and some of their songs are featured in the soundtrack of Sweet Life, a film with Joan Jett.

Band activity
 Joan Jett (1986–present)
 Love Crushed Velvet (2007-present)
 Billy Idol
 Mink DeVille (Coup de Grâce, 1981; Live at Montreux 1982 DVD, 2008)
 Scandal (drums) (1982–1984, 2004–2005)
 David Drew band
 Chris DeMarco (1979-1984)

Studio Work
 Peter Wolf
 Enrique Iglesias
 Frank Wright
 The Waterboys
 Debbie Harry
 Roger Daltrey
 Ric Ocasek
 Ronnie Spector
 Blue Öyster Cult
 The Psychedelic Furs
 Mink DeVille
 Ron Wood
 Steve Lukather
 John Waite
 Sylvester
 Cycle Sluts from Hell
 Spread Eagle
 Michael Monroe
 D. L. Byron
 Steve Stevens
 Batusis
 Mark Duda
 Chris DeMarco

Discography
 Lights On - Price/Sulton (1986)
 Sex Drums & Rock 'n' Roll (2002)
 That's Amore (2007)

References

External links
 Thommy Price on Myspace
 Thommy Price on last.fm
 

1956 births
Living people
Musicians from Brooklyn
Scandal (American band) members
20th-century American drummers
American male drummers
20th-century American male musicians
Mink DeVille members